Mr. Block is an American comics character, created by Ernest Riebe in 1912 and commemorated in a song written by Joe Hill. He is the protagonist of an eponymous satirical comics series which appeared in left-wing publications to sympathize with the common worker. Decades later Mr. Block gained historical importance for being a predecessor to underground comix.

Comic strip

Mr. Block, who has no first name, was created on November 7, 1912, by Ernest Riebe, a member of the Industrial Workers of the World (IWW). Block appeared that day in the Spokane newspaper Industrial Worker, smoking a cigar and wearing a checkered suit with top hat. Subsequently, Mr. Block lost the fancy clothes but often kept a hat, ten sizes too small, perched on one corner of his wooden blockhead.

"Mr. Block is legion," wrote Walker C. Smith in 1913. "He is representative of that host of slaves who think in terms of their masters. Mr. Block owns nothing, yet he speaks from the standpoint of the millionaire; he is patriotic without patrimony; he is a law-abiding outlaw... [who] licks the hand that smites him and kisses the boot that kicks him... the personification of all that a worker should not be."

The song
Joe Hill wrote "Mr. Block" to the tune of "It Looks to Me Like a Big Time Tonight". The song, like the comic strip, is bitterly satirical about the AFL and the Socialist Party. Sometimes also called "Please Give Me Your Attention", it has remained a popular number through multiple editions of the Little Red Songbook.

References

External links
 A collection of cartoons at the IWW website

1912 comics debuts
Comics about politics
American comics characters
American comic strips
Comics characters introduced in 1912
Fictional construction workers
Industrial Workers of the World publications
Male characters in comics
Satirical comics
Songs with lyrics by Joe Hill (activist)
Songs about comics
Songs about fictional male characters
Trade union songs
American satire
American political satire
Comic strips started in the 1910s